The Mississippi Gambler is a 1953 American Western film directed by Rudolph Maté and starring Tyrone Power. The film was nominated for an Oscar for Best Sound Recording (Leslie I. Carey). This film was the third Universal Studios film to bear this title—though with a different plot each time, the others being The Mississippi Gambler (1929) and Mississippi Gambler (1942).

Plot
Mark Fallon persuades professional gambler "Kansas John" Polly to teach him the trade. As they board a riverboat bound for New Orleans, Kansas John advises him to be wary of F. Montague Caldwell, an unscrupulous riverboat gambler.

Mark makes the acquaintance of two fellow passengers, attractive Angelique Dureau and her brother Laurent. Laurent loses a great deal of money at cards. He gives Mark a valuable diamond necklace to redeem his gambling IOUs. When Mark learns that it is Angelique's, he offers it back to her, but she angrily declines. Caldwell hires some men to ambush and rob Mark, but a friend warns Kansas John, and he and Mark jump ashore to reach New Orleans alive.

There, he meets the father of Angelique and Laurent, the suave Edmond Dureau, a noted fencer who is impressed by Mark's own skill with the sword. He invites Mark to his home, despite Mark's warning that his son and daughter would not welcome him. Dureau wishes his daughter would feel differently toward Mark, but Angelique instead weds banker George Elwood.

Mark builds a successful casino. He and Edmond also give a helpful hand to Ann Conant, the sister of an unlucky gambler who committed suicide after losing the money entrusted to him by his firm. Laurent falls for Ann, but she is smitten with Mark, so Laurent forces Mark into a duel. As the challenged party, Mark has the choice of weapons; he selects pistols instead of swords. Laurent dishonorably fires prematurely and misses. Mark refuses to shoot back.

Angelique's husband skips town with his bank's money. Mark, who had refused to withdraw his money out of consideration for Angelique, despite widespread disquieting rumors, is left penniless, so he returns to his old life as a gambler. Angelique realizes her true feelings and asks to go along.

Cast
 Tyrone Power as Mark Fallon
 Piper Laurie as Angelique Dureau
 Julie Adams as Ann Conant (as Julia Adams)
 John McIntire as Kansas John Polly
 Paul Cavanagh as Redmond Dureau
 John Baer as Laurent Dureau
 Ron Randell as George Elwood
 Ralph Dumke as Caldwell
 Robert Warwick as Paul O. Monet
 William Reynolds as Pierre 
 Guy Williams as Andre

Production
Ron Randell had a small role. LIFE magazine that Tyrone Power--in lieu of salary--took a 50% participation deal for his work on the film, and that it was Universal-International's biggest moneymaker that year.

Reception
The film was very popular. Variety estimated it had earned box office rentals in America of $3 million by the end of 1953.

References

External links
 
 
 
 
 Review of film at Variety

1953 films
1953 Western (genre) films
1953 romantic drama films
American Western (genre) films
American romantic drama films
Films set in New Orleans
Films set on ships
Films directed by Rudolph Maté
Films scored by Frank Skinner
Films about gambling
Films about poker
Universal Pictures films
1950s English-language films
1950s American films